Renata Kochta (born 14 April 1973) is a German former professional tennis player.

Biography
Kochta is a daughter of Czechoslovak ice hockey player Jiří and is originally from Prague. Her younger sister Marketa also competed on the professional tour.

Most of Kochta's WTA Tour main draw appearances were in doubles, but she played singles at the 1993 edition of the US Hardcourts in Stratton Mountain. She had a best singles ranking of 301 in the world, which she reached in 1993.

As a doubles player she had career high ranking of 137 and featured in the qualifying draw for the 1993 Wimbledon Championships.

ITF finals

Singles: 5 (1–4)

Doubles: 6 (4–2)

References

External links

1973 births
Living people
German female tennis players
Czechoslovak emigrants to Germany
Tennis players from Prague
20th-century German women